Fred L. Fox (October 24, 1876 – August 8, 1952) was a justice of the Supreme Court of Appeals of West Virginia from January 1, 1937 until his death on August 8, 1952.

Born in Braxton County, West Virginia, Fox received a law degree from West Virginia University in 1899 and entered the practice of law in Sutton, West Virginia. He served as a Democrat in the West Virginia State Senate from 1912 to 1920, including several terms as Democratic leader. He held several other political and governmental offices before being elected to a twelve-year term on the state supreme court in a Democratic wave in 1936.

Fox married Anna Lee Frame, with whom he had three sons and three daughters who survived him. He died from heart disease at the age of 75.

References

1876 births
1952 deaths
People from Braxton County, West Virginia
West Virginia University alumni
West Virginia state senators
Justices of the Supreme Court of Appeals of West Virginia